Joru Ka Ghulam (Eng: Wife's Slave) is a 2014 Pakistani television sitcom aired on Hum TV premiered on 14 October 2014. It stars Nabeel of Bulbulay fame, along with Shehnaz Pervaiz, Anam Tanveer and Mehmood Akhtar.

Summary
Each episode features a different scenario and some episodes are about the family of Nomi themselves, whereas others include guest appearances of other characters.

Cast
Nabeel Zafar as Nomi
Anam Tanveer as Pinky
Mehmood Akhtar as Choudhary Fateh Muhammad Malik
Shehnaz Pervaiz as Reshma
Naveed Raza as Bubloo
Aiman Khan

References

External links
 Official Hum Tv Website

2014 Pakistani television series debuts
Hum TV original programming
Pakistani drama television series
Pakistani television sitcoms
Urdu-language television shows